BUHS may refer to:
 Babcock University High School, Ogun State, Nigeria
 Brattleboro Union High School, Battleboro, Vermont, United States
 Bishop Union High School, Bishop, California, United States
 Brawley Union High School, Brawley, California, United States
 Buckeye Union High School, Buckeye, Arizona, United States